The 2009 Novak Djokovic tennis season officially commenced on January 5 with the start of the 2009 ATP World Tour.

Yearly summary

Grand Slam performances

Australian Open 

Djokovic was a victim of the Melbourne heat as his title defence came to an end at the hands of Roddick. As the city enters a heatwave the No3 seed retired when trailing 6-7, 6-4, 6-2, 2-1.

Roland Garros

Wimbledon

US Open

All matches 
This table chronicles all the matches of Djokovic in 2009, including walkovers (W/O) which the ATP does not count as wins. They are marked ND for non-decision or no decision.

Singles matches 

 Source

Doubles matches 

 Source

Yearly records

Head-to-head matchups 
Novak Djokovic had a  record against the top 10, a  record against the top 50 and a  record against players outside the top 50.

Finals

Singles: 10 (5–5)

See also 
 2009 ATP World Tour
 2009 Roger Federer tennis season
 2009 Rafael Nadal tennis season

References

External links
  
 ATP tour profile

Novak Djokovic tennis seasons
Djokovic
2009 in Serbian sport